Stafholtstungnahreppur was formerly a rural parish (hreppur) in Mýrasýsla county, west Iceland, described as a "typical farm parish". On 11 June 1994 Stafholtstungnahreppur united with Borgarnes, Hraunhreppur and Norðurárdalshreppur under the name Borgarbyggð.

References

Populated places in Iceland